= Kobalt Tools 500 =

Kobalt Tools 500 may refer to:

- Atlanta 500, a NASCAR Cup series race held in Hampton, Georgia; known as Kobalt Tools 500 from 2007 to 2010
- Can-Am 500, a NASCAR Cup series race held in Phoenix, Arizona; known as the Kobalt Tools 500 from 2010 to 2011
